Nijinsky (21 February 1967 – 15 April 1992) was a Canadian-bred, Irish-trained champion Thoroughbred racehorse and sire. He was the outstanding two-year-old in Europe in 1969 when he was unbeaten in five races. In the following season, he became the first horse for thirty-five years to win the English Triple Crown, a feat that has not been repeated as of 2022. He is regarded as one of the greatest European flat racehorses of the 20th century.

He was also historically important for establishing the international reputation of his sire Northern Dancer, though Nijinsky was atypical of Northern Dancer progeny in size and conformation. Retired to stud, he became the leading sire in Great Britain & Ireland and the leading broodmare sire in North America. As a winner of top-class races from 6-14 furlongs, Nijinsky is also considered to be among the most versatile of the great horses of the 20th century.

Background
Nijinsky, a bay horse with a white heart on his forehead and three white feet, was bred at E. P. Taylor's Windfields Farm in Oshawa, Ontario, Canada. He was from the second crop of foals sired by Northern Dancer, the winner of the 1964 Kentucky Derby who went on to become one of the most influential sires of the 20th century. His dam, Flaming Page, by Bull Page, was a highly successful racemare, winning the 1962 Queen's Plate. At stud, she produced only two other foals; one of these was Fleur, who produced the 1977 Epsom Derby winner The Minstrel, the other was Minsky, champion Irish 2 year old in 1970.

He was offered for sale at the Windfields Farm's annual yearling auction where he was bought for $84,000 by the American minerals magnate and industrialist Charles W. Engelhard Jr., acting on the advice of the Irish trainer Vincent O'Brien. It was Engelhard's wife Jane who decided that the colt should be named after the dancer Vaslav Nijinsky. Nijinsky was shipped to Ireland, where he was trained by O'Brien at Ballydoyle, County Tipperary.

Racing career

1969: two-year-old season
Nijinsky's first four races were all at the Curragh. In June, he started at odds of 4/11 and won the six-furlong Erne maiden race easily. He followed up with wins in the Anglesey Stakes and the Railway Stakes. On his fourth appearance, he was extended for the first time in the Beresford Stakes. He won decisively from Decies, a colt who went on to win the Irish 2000 Guineas in 1970. Having proved himself the best of the Irish two-year-olds, he was sent to England in October to contest the Dewhurst Stakes at Newmarket. Ridden for the first time by Lester Piggott, he was held up at the back of the six-horse field before moving through to take the lead inside the final furlong, earning top rating in the British Free Handicap.

1970: three-year-old season

Spring
On his first appearance as a three-year-old, Nijinsky beat the four-year-old Deep Run in the Gladness Stakes at the Curragh in April. The colt was then sent back to Newmarket for the 2000 Guineas over one mile. He started the 4/7 favourite against thirteen opponents. Nijinsky took the lead two furlongs from the finish and, without being put under any pressure by Piggott, pulled clear to win by two and a half lengths from Yellow God. The second had won the Ascot 2,000 Guineas trial and the previous year's Gimcrack Stakes, as well as finishing a close second in the Middle Park Stakes.

Summer
Nijinsky's opposition in the Derby at Epsom was stronger and he started at odds of 11/8 – the only time he was ever odds against. His rivals were headed by the French-trained colts Stintino and Gyr. The veteran French trainer Etienne Pollet had delayed his retirement for a year to guide Gyr, a son of his champion Sea-Bird, through his three-year-old season. Nijinsky was held up by Piggott as usual before moving forward in the straight, by which time Gyr was in front and pulling clear of the Prix Lupin winner, Stintino. A furlong and a half from the finish, Piggott used his whip on Nijinsky. The favourite responded immediately, catching Gyr in a few strides and pulling ahead to win from him by two and a half lengths, with Stintino third.

The winning time of 2:34.68 was the fastest Epsom Derby since 1936. Nijinsky's time for the last two furlongs of the race (10.6 and 11.25 seconds, respectively) was of sprint championship-winning standard. Piggott claimed that he was "always cantering", while Bill Williamson, who rode Gyr, said that "Nijinsky was just too good". Gyr subsequently franked the form by easily winning the Grand Prix de Saint-Cloud.

On the day before the Derby, Nijinsky had overcome a severe bout of colic which could have threatened his life.

On 27 June, Nijinsky followed up his Epsom win by taking the Irish Derby at the Curragh. Ridden by Liam Ward, he started at odds of 4/11 and accelerated late to win by three lengths from Meadowville. In July, Nijinsky raced against older horses in the King George VI and Queen Elizabeth Stakes at Ascot. His five opponents included winners of major races: Blakeney (1969 Epsom Derby), Karabas (Washington, D.C. International Stakes), Crepellana (Prix de Diane) and Caliban (Coronation Cup). Without being extended, Nijinsky moved through to take the lead a furlong from the finish and won by two lengths from Blakeney despite being eased down to a canter in the closing stages.

In August, Nijinsky contracted ringworm, which seriously affected his training schedule. The horse lost most of the hair on his body.

Autumn
Nijinsky appeared to be recovering after being placed on a "rich" diet including raw eggs and Irish Stout, and was sent to Doncaster for the St. Leger in September. In the one mile and six furlongs race, he was attempting to become the first horse since Bahram 35 years earlier to complete the English Triple Crown. He started the 2/7 favourite and won comfortably, although his margin of victory over Meadowville was only one length. As of 2022, he is the last horse to accomplish the feat of sweeping the English Triple Crown: since 1970 only Reference Point (1987), Nashwan (1989), Sea The Stars (2009) and Camelot (2012) have won two of the three races, but Oh So Sharp won the filly's version of the Triple Crown in 1985.

In his next race, Nijinsky was sent to France for the Prix de l'Arc de Triomphe at Longchamp in Paris in October. Piggott produced Nijinsky in the straight to make his challenge but was baulked twice before making his run on the wide outside. However, 150m from the finish he caught front runners Miss Dan and Sassafras and took a slight lead. In the last strides, Nijinsky appeared to veer left away from Piggott's whip, and Sassafras, ridden by Yves Saint-Martin, produced a renewed effort to regain the advantage and win by a head. While many, including his trainer Vincent O'Brien, felt that Piggott had given Nijinsky too much ground to make up and had left his challenge too late, the jockey, who was heavily criticised by the media and racing public, said that in his opinion Nijinsky was past his peak for the year. It is beyond dispute that Nijinsky was a most unlucky loser.

Less than two weeks after his defeat in the Arc, Nijinsky ran his last race in the Champion Stakes over ten furlongs at Newmarket. Although he had been known to sweat freely before some of his previous races, Nijinsky on this occasion appeared to become particularly nervous and anxious before the start. In the race itself, he ran well below his best form and was beaten 3/4 length at odds of 4/11 by the five-year-old English horse Lorenzaccio. O'Brien on this occasion concurred with Piggott, saying that Nijinsky appeared to have "lost his fire." Nijinsky was retired to stand at stud at Claiborne Farm near Paris, Kentucky having been syndicated in August for $5,440,000.

Assessment and honours
Nijinsky was given a rating of 138 by Timeform, the second-highest for a winner of the Epsom Derby up to that time.  He was Timeform's Horse of the Year for 1970. Nijinsky was also voted British Horse of the Year by the Racecourse Association, gaining 38 of the 40 votes.

In 2018 Nijinsky was rated the greatest-ever Epsom Derby winner by a panel of experts assembled by the Daily Telegraph. In 2021, the Sporting Life ranked Nijinsky's Derby win no. 1, ahead of Sea Bird, in their top-40 runnings of the race. In their book A Century of Champions, John Randall and Tony Morris rated Nijinsky as a "great" Derby winner and the best Irish racehorse of the 20th century.

Vincent O'Brien named Nijinsky and Sir Ivor as the best horses he had trained, placing Nijinsky first "for brilliance." Lester Piggott concurs saying ""I think Nijinsky probably on his day was the most brilliant horse I've ever ridden". Piggott added later that Nijinsky, during the summer of 1970 when he won the 2,000 Guineas, Epsom Derby, Irish Derby and King George VI and Queen Elizabeth II Stakes, was "an unbeatable horse"

In 1970, a film was made about his racing career entitled A Horse Called Nijinsky. Narrated by Orson Welles, it was released in British cinemas and in 1988 released on VHS video. The Nijinsky team also was voted winners of the 1970 BBC Sports Personality of the Year Team Award. Among the more unusual tributes, a Cabernet Sauvignon wine and a variety of winter wheat have been named in Nijinsky's honour. Bronze statues of him stand at Ballydoyle and at The Curragh racecourse.

Stud record
Having been sent to stand at stud in the United States, Nijinsky was registered there as Nijinsky II.

The horse was an excellent sire. He sired 155 Stakes/Group winners (18.1% of 862 total foals) and 519 individual winners (60.2%), ranging over the full range of distances at which he excelled as a racehorse. He is the only sire to have a winner of the Kentucky and Epsom Derbies in the same year (1986). The horse was champion sire in Great Britain and Ireland in 1986 and champion broodmare sire in the United States in 1993 and 1994.

His notable progeny included:
 Caucasus - winner of 1975 Irish St Leger and later three Grade 1 races in America
 Caerleon – Three-Year-Old Champion Colt in France, won the Group One Prix du Jockey Club and International Stakes, Leading sire in Great Britain & Ireland (1988, 1991)
 Dancing Spree – won 1989 Breeders' Cup Sprint, Suburban Handicap, Carter Handicap, True North Handicap, Churchill Downs Handicap, Gulfstream Park Sprint Championship
 De La Rose - Champion US filly (Eclipse Award), 1981
 Ferdinand – 1986 Kentucky Derby & 1987 Breeders' Cup Classic, United States Horse of the Year
 Golden Fleece – won 1982 Epsom Derby, undefeated Champion Three-Year-Old Colt in England & Ireland
 Green Dancer – won 1974 Futurity Stakes, 1975 Prix Lupin, Poule d'Essai des Poulains, Leading sire in France in 1991
 Ile de Bourbon – won 1978 King George VI and Queen Elizabeth Stakes
 Kings Lake - won 1981 Irish 2000 Guineas, Sussex Stakes and Joe McGrath Memorial Stakes
 Lammtarra – undefeated, won 1995 Epsom Derby, King George VI and Queen Elizabeth Stakes and Prix de l'Arc de Triomphe
 Maplejinsky - winner of Monmouth Oaks and Alabama Stakes, dam of American Triple Tiara of Thoroughbred Racing (US fillies' Triple Crown) winner Sky Beauty
 Niniski - won 1979 Irish St Leger, Prix Royal Oak
 Princesse Lida, Champion French 2 year old filly
 Quiet Fling - won 1976 Coronation Cup
 Royal Academy – won July Cup and Breeders' Cup Mile, sired Bullish Luck, Val Royal, and Bel Esprit, sire of Black Caviar
 Seattle Dancer – in 1985 the world's most expensive yearling, selling for US$13.1 million
 Shadeed – won 1985 2,000 Guineas, sired Alydeed
 Shahrastani – won 1986 Epsom Derby, Irish Derby
 Sky Classic – Canadian Horse Racing Hall of Fame, US Eclipse Award winner
 Solford – winner of the 1983 Eclipse Stakes
 Whiskey Road - sire of Strawberry Road

Nijinsky was a favourite of Queen Elizabeth II and she visited him as often as possible at Claiborne Stud.

Nijinsky was euthanised in April 1992 as a result of "the infirmities of old age" after suffering from laminitis since 1985. He is buried at Claiborne Farm.

Pedigree

See also
 List of historical horses

References

Further reading

 Sampson, Lesley I. Nijinsky: Blue Riband Sire (1985) J.A. Allen & Co Ltd 

1967 racehorse births
1992 racehorse deaths
Racehorses bred in Ontario
Racehorses trained in Ireland
Canadian Horse Racing Hall of Fame inductees
Triple Crown of Thoroughbred Racing winners
European Thoroughbred Horse of the Year
United States Champion Thoroughbred Sires
American Champion Thoroughbred broodmare sires
British Champion Thoroughbred Sires
Irish Classic Race winners
Thoroughbred family 8-f
Chefs-de-Race
Epsom Derby winners
2000 Guineas winners
St Leger winners
King George VI and Queen Elizabeth Stakes winners